Kais Dukes is a British computer scientist and software developer, known for the development of the Quranic Arabic Corpus.

Dukes was born to an English father who converted to Islam and a Saudi Arabian mother, and grew up bilingual.

Work
An Artificial Intelligence Approach to Arabic and Islamic Content on the Internet in: Proceedings of NITS 3rd National Information Technology Symposium, 2011. With Eric Atwell, Claire Brierley, Majdi Sawalha and Abdul-Baquee Sharaf.
Morphological Annotation of Qur'anic Arabic in: Proceedings of the International Conference on Language Resources and Evaluation, Malta, 2010. With Nizar Habash.

Citations

External links
Official profile

People from Sussex
1979 births
Living people
English people of Saudi Arabian descent
English computer scientists